Citrusdal is a town of 5,000 people in the Olifants River Valley in the Western Cape province of South Africa. Agriculture in the area is dominated by citrus fruit farming, hence the town's name. Natural hot water springs occur in the area.

History
Citrusdal was established in 1916 by the Nederduits Gereformeerde Kerk to serve the upper Olifants River valley. The church bought a portion of Middelpost farm, on which a township was laid out. A town council was established in 1957.

Demographics
In the 2001 Census the population of Citrusdal was recorded as 5,023 people in 1,401 households. 73% of the residents described themselves as "Coloured", 21% as "White" and 6% as "Black African". The dominant language is Afrikaans, spoken as the first language of 95% of the population, while 4% speak isiXhosa and 1% speak English.

Schools
Citrusdal High which is situated in the Olifants River Valley is a small school with approximately 350 students.

References

External links
 Citrusdal Tourism Office
 Cederberg Local Municipality

Populated places in the Cederberg Local Municipality
Hot springs of South Africa
Populated places established in 1916